The 2014–15 Indiana Hoosiers men's basketball team represented Indiana University in the 2014–15 NCAA Division I men's basketball season. Their head coach was Tom Crean, in his seventh season with the Hoosiers. The team played its home games at Assembly Hall in Bloomington, Indiana, and was a member of the Big Ten Conference. This season marked the 115th season of basketball at Indiana University.

The Hoosiers went 20–14 overall and 9–9 in the Big Ten Conference to finish in a tie for seventh place. Much of the Hoosiers' difficulties were caused by a lack of defense and post presence. The Hoosiers improved over last season, where they didn't appear in any postseason tournament, by being selected to play in the NCAA tournament as a #10 seed in the Midwest region. They made an early exit as #7 Wichita State knocked them off in the second round.

Previous season
The Hoosiers finished the season with an overall record of 17–15, with a record of 7–11 in the Big Ten regular season, tying for eighth place. After not being selected to play in the NIT, Indiana chose not to accept an invitation to the CBI claiming, "We're Indiana. We don't play in the CBI".

Preseason
The Hoosiers began the preseason with a five-game trip to Canada in August. They finished 4–1, shooting 42% from three-point range. James Blackmon, Jr. and Troy Williams were the leading scorers, with 18.8 and 18.4 ppg.

Departures

Recruiting class
In addition to the six incoming freshmen recruits, Indiana is also adding Nick Zeisloft, a graduate transfer from Illinois State. He is eligible to play immediately and has two years of eligibility.

Roster

Schedule

|-
!colspan=12 style="background:#7D110C; color:white;"| Foreign Trip

|-
!colspan=12 style="background:#7D110C; color:white;"| Exhibition

|-
!colspan=12 style="background:#7D110C; color:white;"| Non-conference regular season

|-
!colspan=12 style="background:#7D110C; color:white;"| Big Ten regular season

|-
!colspan=12 style="background:#7D110C; color:white;"| Big Ten tournament

|-
!colspan=12 style="background:#7D110C; color:white;"| NCAA tournament

Rankings

See also
2014–15 Indiana Hoosiers women's basketball team

References

Indiana Hoosiers men's basketball seasons
Indiana
Indiana
2014 in sports in Indiana
2015 in sports in Indiana